Swimming is the fourth and final studio album by New York-based indie rock band French Kicks. Their first self-produced album, Swimming is marked by a more stripped-down sound than is found on their previous albums. Explaining the recording process, guitarist Josh Wise said that the band "used a lot of first and second takes and tried to preserve a sense of immediacy and discovery that comes from putting things down before you really have a chance to think too hard."  It was released on March 31, 2008, receiving overwhelmingly positive reviews.

Track listing
 "Abandon" – 3:56
 "Over the World" – 4:26
 "Carried Away" – 3:29
 "New Man" – 4:38
 "Said So What" – 4:16
 "Atlanta" – 4:48
 "Love in the Ruins" – 3:38
 "With the Fishes" – 3:39
 "The Way You Arrive" – 4:19
 "All Our Weekends" – 4:03
 "Sex Tourists" – 3:29
 "This Could Go Wrong" – 3:42

References

External links
French Kicks official website

French Kicks albums
2008 albums
Vagrant Records albums